Purple Cow: Transform Your Business by Being Remarkable is a 2003 book by Seth Godin. The book presents Godin's personal belief that creative advertising is less effective today because of clutter and advertising avoidance. The book advocates that companies produce remarkable products and target people who are likely to spread word of mouth about the product. USA Today said it "reminds business people of the tried-and-true path to success: Make a great product".

Analysis 
The book consists of general concepts interspersed with examples. The argument starts with the presumption that advertising is less effective than it has been, and that the only way now to gain attention in a market is to not only market a product in a remarkable manner, but also to have a remarkable product to market. Godin gives examples of products and marketing programs that have been remarkable, but indicates that it is no use copying these directly.  He says, "Today, the one sure way to fail is to be boring. Your one chance for success is to be remarkable."

The book ends with a Ten Point Checklist that sets out how to create a remarkable product.

Criticism
The book's key assumption that advertising is broken has been criticised as being contradicted by research.

Marketing and sales 
Purple Cow was itself marketed through some of the techniques that Godin describes in his book. The first, self-published edition came packaged in a milk carton and was sold for just shipping and handling charges. The cover is purple and white, and the words are printed sideways.
In the book's first two years of release, it sold more than 150,000 copies over the course of 23 printings.

References 

2003 non-fiction books
Brand management
Marketing books